The Battle of Yialousa was a minor engagement on 17 December 1955. As part of the Cyprus Emergency, armed men of the EOKA took part in a series of attacks on police stations across Cyprus. The police station at Yialousa was attacked by 12 men resulting in the death of a British artillery officer, Lieutenant John Kelly.

Accounts vary on the aftermath of the attack. Andreas Varnava' highly pro-EOKA book suggests the British troops at the station 'panicked' and failed to pursue, whereas other sources state that members of 40th Field Regiment, RA actually pursued and captured several EOKA fighters.</ref>

References

Yialousa
Cyprus Emergency